Mistastin crater is a meteorite crater in Labrador, Canada which contains the roughly circular Mistastin Lake. The age of the crater is calculated to be 36.6 ± 2 million years (Eocene).

The lake was first identified as a possible impact crater in 1968, after being viewed from space.

Location
Mistastin crater, aka Kamestastin, is located in northwestern inland Labrador, due west of Natuashish, near the Quebec border. It lies within the traditional hunting grounds of the Mushuau Innu First Nation.  Although it is not within a declared reserve, it does require permission to visit.

Formation and geology
Mistastin crater was created 36 million years ago by a violent asteroid impact. The presence of cubic zirconia around the crater rim suggests that the impact generated temperatures in excess of  43% that of the surface of the Sun and the highest crustal temperatures known on  produced global changes that lasted for decades after the impact.

Mishta-minishtikᐡ, the lake's arcuate central island, is interpreted to be the central uplift of the complex crater structure. The target rocks were part of a batholith composed of adamellite, mangerite and lenses of anorthosite. There are abundant shock metamorphic features exhibited in the rocks of the island. Planar deformation features, diaplectic glass, melt rocks, and shatter cones have been identified.

See also 
 West Hawk Lake, the site of a similar impact crater in Manitoba

References

Further reading
 Currie, K.L. Larochelle, A. (1969) "A paleomagnetic study of volcanic rocks from Mistastin Lake, Labrador, Canada". Earth and Planetary Science Letters, v. 6, pp. 309–315.
 Currie, K.L. (1971) "Geology of the resurgent cryptoexplosion crater at Mistastin Lake, Labrador". Geological Survey of Canada Bulletin 207, 62 p.
 Currie, K.L. (1971) "The composition of anomalous plagioclase glass and coexisting plagioclase from Mistastin Lake, Labrador, Canada". Mineralogical Magazine, v. 38, pp. 511–517.
 Grieve, R.A.F. (1975) "Petrology and chemistry of the impact melt at Mistastin Lake crater, Labrador". Geological Society of America Bulletin 86, pp. 1617–1629.
 Mak, E.K.C. York, D., Grieve, R.A.F. and Dence, M.R. (1976) "The age of the Mistastin Lake crater, Labrador, Canada". Earth and Planetary Science Letters, v. 31, pp. 345–357.
 Marchand, M. Crocket, J.H. (1977) "Sr isotopes and trace element geochemistry of the impact melt and target rocks at the Mistastin Lake crater, Labrador". Geochimica et Cosmochimica Acta, v. 41, pp. 1487–1495.

External links
 Aerial Exploration of the Mistastin Structure

Impact craters of Canada
Eocene impact craters
Labrador
Lakes of Newfoundland and Labrador
Impact crater lakes